Chris Pusey (28 March 1950 – October 2002) was an international speedway rider from England.

Speedway career 
Pusey rode in the top tier of British Speedway from 1967 to 1981, riding for various clubs. He reached the final of the British Speedway Championship on three occasions in 1970, 1975 and 1975.

References 

1950 births
2002 deaths
British speedway riders
Belle Vue Aces riders
Halifax Dukes riders
Workington Comets riders
Weymouth Wildcats riders
People from Maghull